John Bogie (born 28 December 1963) is a Kenyan former judoka. He competed in the men's half-lightweight event at the 1988 Summer Olympics.

References

External links
 

1963 births
Living people
Kenyan male judoka
Olympic judoka of Kenya
Judoka at the 1988 Summer Olympics
Place of birth missing (living people)
20th-century Kenyan people
21st-century Kenyan people